Middle Military District (Milo M) was a Swedish military district, a command of the Swedish Armed Forces that had operational control over Middle Sweden, for most time of its existence corresponding to the area covered by the counties of Östergötland, Södermanland, Stockholm, Uppsala, Västmanland, Örebro, Värmland, Kopparberg (now Dalarna County) and Gävleborg. The headquarters of Milo M were located in Strängnäs.

History 
Milo M was created in 1991 when the number of military districts of Sweden was decreased to five, and as a consequence of that, the Eastern Military District (Milo Ö) was merged with Bergslagen Military District (Milo B) to create this new military district. In 1993, the number of military districts of Sweden was decreased to three, and as a consequence of that, the territory of Gävleborg County formerly part of Lower Norrland Military District (Milo NN), was merged into the military district. In 2000, these last three military districts were disbanded and the command for the whole of Sweden was placed at the Swedish Armed Forces Headquarters, in accordance with the Defence Act of 2000.

Heraldry and traditions

Coat of arms
The coat of arms of the Middle Military District Staff 1991–2000. It was also used by the Central Military District Staff 2000–2005. Blazon: "Or, the provincial badge of Södermanland, a griffon segreant sable, armed and langued gules, on a chief azur three open crowns fesswise or. The shield surmounting an erect sword of the last colour."

Medals
In 2000, the Mellersta militärområdesstabens (MilostabM) minnesmedalj ("Middle Military District Staff (MilostabM) Commemorative Medal") in silver (MiloMSMM) of the 8th size was established. The medal ribbon is of yellow moiré with a black stripe on each side and a broad red stripe on the middle.

Commanding officers

Military commanders
1991–1994: Torsten Engberg
1 July 1994–1998: Dick Börjesson
1998–2000: Percurt Green
2000–2000: Kjell Koserius

Chiefs of Staff
1991–1992: Bengt Anderberg
1992–1993: Svante Bergh
1994–1995: Lennart Rönnberg
1995–1997: Anders Lindström
1997–2000: Kjell Koserius

Names, designations and locations

See also
Military district (Sweden)

Footnotes

References

Notes

Print

Web

Military districts of Sweden
Disbanded units and formations of Sweden
Military units and formations established in 1991
Military units and formations disestablished in 2000
1901 establishments in Sweden
2000 disestablishments in Sweden
Strängnäs Garrison